Maloth (also known as malom) is a village in Kasaragod district of the state of Kerala.,
Maloth is a village in Western Ghats. It is situated in the Balal Panchayath of Kasaragod District of Kerala. It is a part of the Kasaragod Parliament constituency. Earlier it was in the Hosdurg assembly constituency which is renamed as Kanhangad after the delimitation of assembly constituencies in 2011. It shares borders with the Karnataka forest. Nearest towns are Kanhangad, Cherupuzha, and Nileshwaram. One can reach Maloth through bus from Kanhangad or from Cherupuzha. Private as well as KSRTC buses  playing between Kanhangad and Konnakkad passes through the village.

Demographics
 India census, There are total 3,565 families residing. The Maloth village has a population of 14,660 of which 7,285 are males and 7,375 are females.
The population of children with age 0-6 is 1,470 which makes up 10% of total population of village. The literacy rate of Maloth was 88.67% lower compared to 94.00% for Kerala. The male literacy stands at 91.05%, while female literacy rate was 86.33%.

Infrastructure
Major infrastructures in the area include rural roads, electricity, drinking water supply facilities and telephone connection. Almost all the rural roads are paved. As a part of the EMS Housing scheme the majority of people living under the Below Poverty Line are provided with new houses. Major part of the village is electrified . However, the public transport facility is not covering several portions of the village now. Almost all residents have mobile phones, but there are places where there is no range for the mobile operators.

Malom
Malom is a town in the village. The exact geographic position of the village is given as 2°22′0″N 75°21′0″E.  The  town is situated in the Hill Highway (Kerala).

Malom Service Co-operative Bank and the Women Co-operative Bank are the main banking institutions. The telephone exchange is near the mosque. A diary co-operative society and the public distribution shop are other major public initiatives in the town. Malom post office, which was earlier situated in Darkas is now shifted to the Cultural Center building near the diary co-operative society. The post office is in the Extra Departmental(ED)facility of the Postal department and is under the Parappa main Post Office. One Government Ayurveda dispensary and a private Homeopathic dispensary operate in the town, and Malom has several shops for provisions, teashops, computer centers, Studios, Chemists Shops, Ayurvadic Chemists Shops etc. The Malom Vrindavan Theater no longer exists. One can hire jeeps/Auto Rikshaws from here and also get rooms for rent. The project of Malayora Highway is passing through Malom town.

There are many tourist sports in and around the Village. Kottanchery, which is situated about 55 km north east of Kanhangad is popular for picnics and treks. Maloth is also a Christian migrated village. Roman Catholic Christians from South Kerala especially from Pala and Kottayam migrated to Malom since the 1950s. They established several Catholic Churches in and around Malom. Majority of them are small farmers and merchants.

Rubber is the main crop, and tapioca, arecanut, cashew pepper, plantain, ginger, and turmeric are also produced. Price fluctuations in the markets affects the profitability of farming, and the younger generation is generally reluctant to take up farming as their profession for livelihood.

Education

Formal education is offered by Government Higher Secondary School Maloth Kasba.The school is situated in Vallikkadavu. It is one of the biggest schools in Kasaragod district in terms of the number of students. Besides GHSS Maloth Kasba there is the St Savio English Medium School, near the St George church Vallikkadavu. Jaycees School is another unaided Private school. Higher education institutions include government college Elerithattu, St. Pius X College, Rajapuram Nehru Arts and Science College Kanhangad and Government college Kasaragod, and some students travel to Bangalore, Cochin, and other areas to pursue some new generation courses and Nursing course.

Adjoining areas
 
The Malom town is in the lap of several adjoining hilly human habitations. The majority of those who resides here are Farmers, agricultural laborers and traders.It is a Christian majority area. Other communities include Hindus and Muslims. The ratio of Scheduled castes and scheduled tribes to the total population is also significant. Valiya Puncha, Venthamala, Konnakkad, Karuvankayam, Chully, Pullady, Padayankallu are the surrounding areas.The farmers and the merchants have to reach Malom to buy provisions and to sell their agricultural products. All these places are connected with rural roads, but in several places it is yet to be paved. Hence in Monsoons it is difficult for villagers to reach Malom.

Valiya Puncha, Pullady, Padayankallu and Venthamala are hilly areas which lies about 500 meters above the sea level. These places share their borders with the Karnataka forest. Elephants and Wild Boars straying into farming fields from the forests poses serious threat to life and property of farmers residing in these borders. Other surrounding areas are low-lying valley of the peaks in Western Ghats.

Pullody
 
Pullody is a hilly area in Maloth village of Kasaragod district in Kerala with a high altitude from sea level. The hills are covered with mist and snow, which attracts tourists. This place is near the Kerala-Karnataka border. The Palakolli waterfalls and the estate are very near to this place. St. Alphonsa Catholic Church Pullody is located here. This place is 4 km away from malom town on Malom - Kolichal HillHighway. There are some bus services to Kanhangad from Pullody, and some jeep trips to Kallar and Kolichal. There are occasional problems with elephants from the nearby Kerala-Karnataka forests, and this is a less populated area, with a population mainly of farmers. Rubber, coconut, and bananas are cultivated here. The majority of the people are Hindus and Christians. Janakeeyam Pullody is a people co-operative jeep service that runs between pullody and Malom town. This jeep service was established in 2008.

Valiya Puncha
Valiya Puncha is another hilly area which is situated about 4 km from Malom Town. One can get Jeep services from Malom to Valiya Puncha. Malom-Mandalam-Kuzhippunam-Cheriya Puncha Valiyapuncha road passes through the Kerala Forest at Anakuzhi before joining Maikkayam and Konnakkad. However the brief unpaved road stretch from Valiya Puncha to Maikayam makes the journey difficult. There is a government LP School and an Ankanvadi in Cheriya Puncha. Cheriya Puncha also accommodates the St. Thomas Church, a Saint Thomas Christian church of the village. Major crops include rubber, tapioca, coconut,arecanut, cashew pepper, banana, ginger, and turmeric.

Karuvankayam
Karuvankayam is known as "lamp of Malom."

Transportation
This village is connected to Karnataka state through Panathur. There is a 20 km long road from Panathur to Sullia in Karnataka from where Bangalore and Mysore can be easily accessed. Locations in Kerala can be accessed by driving towards the western side. The nearest railway station is Nileshwar railway station on Mangalore-Palakkad line. There are airports at Mangalore and Calicut.

References

Nileshwaram area